Smermesnil is a commune in the Seine-Maritime department in the Normandy region in northern France.

Geography
A farming commune created from three ancient parishes and  situated at the 2nd highest point in the department, between the valleys of the Yères and the Eaulne rivers in the Pays de Bray.

Population

Places of interest
 The château, built with stone from the ancient abbey de Foucarmont.
 The church of St. Martin, dating from the thirteenth century.
 The church of St. Jean, dating from the sixteenth century.
 The church of St. Madeleine, dating from the sixteenth century.

See also
Communes of the Seine-Maritime department

References

Communes of Seine-Maritime